

an
An-DTPA
An-MAA
An-sulfur colloid

ana-and
Ana-Kit
anacetrapib (USAN, INN)
Anacin-3
Anadrol-50
Anafranil
anagestone (INN)
anagliptin  (INN)
anagrelide (INN)
Anaids Tablet
anakinra (INN)
Analpram-HC
AnaMantle HC
Anamine Syrup
anamorelin (USAN, INN)
Anandron
Anaprox
anaritide (INN)
Anaspaz
anastrozole (INN)
Anatrast
anatumomab mafenatox (INN)
Anatuss
anaxirone (INN)
anazocine (INN)
anazolene sodium (INN)
Anbesol
ancarolol (INN)
Ancef
ancestim (INN)
ancitabine (INN)
Ancobon
Ancotyl
ancriviroc (USAN)
ancrod (INN)
andolast (INN)
Andriol
Androcur
Androderm
Androgel
Android-f
Android
Androlone
androstanolone (INN)

ane-anp
Anectine
Anemagen OB
Angeliq
Anergan
Anestacon
Anexsia
Angio-Conray
Angiomax
angiotensin ii (INN)
angiotensinamide (INN)
Angiovist 282
Angiscein
Anhydron
anidoxime (INN)
anilamate (INN)
anileridine (INN)
anilopam (INN)
Animi-3
anipamil (INN)
aniracetam (INN)
anirolac (INN)
anisacril (INN)
anisindione (INN)
anisopirol (INN)
anistreplase (INN)
anitrazafen (INN)
anivamersen (USAN, INN)
Anodynos-DHC
Anolor 300
Anoquan
anpirtoline (INN)

anr-anz
anrukinzumab (USAN, INN)
Ansaid
Ansolysen
ansoxetine (INN)
Anspor
Antabuse
antafenite (INN)
Antagon
Antagonate
antazoline (INN)
antazonite (INN)
antelmycin (INN)
Antepar
Anthra-Derm
Anthraforte
Anthranol
Anthrascalp
anthiolimine (INN)
antienite (INN)
Antilirium
Antiminth
Antineaream
antithrombin alfa (USAN)
antithrombin iii, human (INN)
Antitussive
Antivert
Antizol
antrafenine (INN)
antramycin (INN)
Antrenyl
Antrizine
Anturane
Anusol hc
Anxanil Oral
Anzemet (Sanofi-Aventis), also known as dolasetron

ap

apa-apr
apadenoson (USAN, INN)
apadoline (INN)
apafant (INN)
apalcillin (INN)
Apap with codeine phosphate
Apatate
apaxifylline (INN)
apaziquone (USAN)
Aphedrid
Aphrodyne
Aphthasol
apicycline (INN)
Apidra (Sanofi-Aventis), also known as insulin
apilimod (INN)
apixaban (USAN, INN)
aplaviroc (USAN, INN)
aplindore (USAN)
Aplisol
Aplitest
Apogen
Apokyn
apolizumab (USAN)
apoptozole
apovincamine (INN)
APPG
apraclonidine (INN)
apramycin (INN)
apratastat (USAN, INN)
apremilast (USAN, INN)
Apresazide
Apresoline-Esidrix
Apresoline
Apri
apricitabine (INN)
apricoxib (USAN, INN)
aprikalim (INN)
aprindine (INN)
aprinocarsen (USAN)
aprobarbital (INN)
Aprodine
aprofene :ru:Апрофен (INN)
aprosulate sodium (INN)
aprotinin (INN)

apt
aptazapine (INN)
aptiganel (INN)
aptocaine (INN)